Albolote is a city located in the province of Granada, Spain. It is one of the thirty-four entities which together form Granada's
Metropolitan Area. It is formed by several populations: El Aire, El Chaparral, and Parque del
Cubillas y Pretel. There are also several residential areas throughout the legal borders of the municipality. Inside those limits you can also find Granada's Penitential Center (Centro Penitencial de Granada, in Spanish). According to Spain's Instituto Nacional de Estadística, the city had a total population of 15,563 in 2005.

On 19 April 1956, Albolote and the neighboring town of Atarfe were struck by a 5.0 earthquake, Spain's most destructive of the 20th century. About a dozen people died from the earthquake and subsequent landslide, and many buildings were ruined.

The Granada metro network, scheduled to open in 2014, will provide the town with a light metro link to central Granada.

History 
Albolote was born as a town with the arrival of the Nasrid dynasty to the Emirate of Granada. The term comes from the Arabic term  'Qaryat al-Bollut', meaning 'Oak town'  It was planned to be a place of rest for the troops guarding the Royal Path of Jaén. Near Albolote took place the Battle of La Higueruela on July first 1431, where king's Juan II of Castille's troops defeated the Muslim armies. This battle was illustrated at the Monastery El Escorial.

In the 17th century it changed to be an estate of Don Antonio Álvarez de Bohórquez, the first marquis de los Trujillos. In the year 1803 the king, Carlos IV gave the title of Duque de Gor to Don Nicolás Mauricio Álvarez de Bohórquez.

Geography 
There are four rivers which flow through Albolote: Juncaril, Colomera, Cubillas, and Magon. It is also worth mentioning the Cubillas reservoir, dedicated both to leisure and water reserve.

Climate 
Albolote enjoys a mediterranean climate: fresh winters and hot summers. There's a great thermic oscillation varying up to 20 °C in a single day. Most of the rain falls during winter, meaning it scarcely rains throughout the summer.

Demography

According to the Instituto Nacional de
Estadística de España, in the year 2014 Albolote had 18,306 inhabitants.

Politics 
These are the results for the last elections in Albolote:

Communications 
In Albolote a lot of important roads converge:  autovías A-44 
that joins Jaen with Granada and its cost-with the A-92, between Almeria
and Sevilla. It also stands out the future Segunda circunvalación de Granada (GR-30), that is
currently under construction. This road will join Albolote and Alhendin
without the need to cross through the center of Granada, with the relieve that
this will suppose to the vehicles that come from Ciudad Real and
Jaén to the  costa mediterránea in Granada.

The principal roads are:

Bus 
Albolote has a bus service run by Granada's
consortium:

Line 122 (Granada-Maracena-Albolote-Atarfe)

Line 123 (Granada-Albolote por Carretera de
Jaén)

Line 117 (Granada-Pantano de Cubillas)

METRO:

Since September 2017, Albolote is connected to Granada by the metro.

Public services

Healthcare 
Albolote has a basic zone of healthcare, inside the sanitary district of Granada. The town has a healthcare center in the street Alfonso XIII Nº7, and a medical consultory in the town of Chaparral.

Education 
The town has 13 education centers where there is education for people of all ages:

Culture 
The popular celebrations are held during the first weekend of August beginning in Thursday. These celebrations are in honor of the saint of the town, the Holly Christ of Health.

References

External links
Official city website (in Spanish)

Municipalities in the Province of Granada